Monkey Island 2: LeChuck's Revenge is an adventure game developed and published by LucasArts in 1991. A sequel to 1990's The Secret of Monkey Island, it is the second game in the Monkey Island series. It was the sixth LucasArts game to use the SCUMM engine, and the first game to use the iMUSE sound system. In it, pirate Guybrush Threepwood searches for the legendary treasure of Big Whoop and again faces off against the pirate LeChuck, who is now a zombie.

The development team for Monkey Island 2 was largely the same as for The Secret of Monkey Island. The project was led by Ron Gilbert, who was again joined by Tim Schafer and Dave Grossman. The game was a critical success, but a commercial disappointment. Monkey Island 2 was followed by The Curse of Monkey Island in 1997; the third game in the series had to deal with the predecessor's ambiguous ending and to vaguely explain it. In 2022, a sixth game Return to Monkey Island was released, whose plot begins right after the cliffhanger of Monkey Island 2, but is not a sequel to the latter, and the games following Monkey Island 2 all remain canonical. A "Special Edition" remake of Monkey Island 2 was released in 2010, following a similar remake of the first game.

Gameplay

LeChuck's Revenge plays like most SCUMM-based point-and-click adventure games. Actions and dialogues are depicted on an Animation Window which covers the top of the screen; verbal commands are listed in the lower left-hand corner of the screen, while Inventory items are shown as icons on the lower right-hand corner. A Sentence Line is located below the Animation Window and serves in describing the actions of the player.

The game was one of the few adventure games that offered the player a choice in levels of puzzle difficulty. In some versions, before starting the game, the player is prompted to choose between regular version and "Monkey 2 Lite", a relatively stripped-down experience that bypasses many puzzles entirely. On the back of the game's packaging it is (jokingly) stated that this mode is intended for video-game reviewers.

Plot
Several months after the events of The Secret of Monkey Island, Guybrush Threepwood is on Scabb Island searching for the legendary treasure of "Big Whoop". He is robbed by Largo LeGrande, former first mate of the pirate LeChuck whose ghost Guybrush defeated in the previous game. Largo has imposed an embargo on the island, preventing anyone from leaving. Visiting the International House of Mojo in the island's swamp, Guybrush receives guidance from the Voodoo Lady who assisted him in his prior adventure. Through actions involving laundry and grave robbing, Guybrush collects the necessary materials for her to make a voodoo doll of Largo, which Guybrush uses against him. However, Guybrush makes the mistake of showing Largo LeChuck's still-living beard, which Largo steals and uses to resurrect LeChuck as a zombie.

From his island fortress, LeChuck swears revenge against Guybrush. The Voodoo Lady reveals that Big Whoop contains the secret to another world which will allow Guybrush to escape LeChuck forever. She gives Guybrush a book which says that the four pirates who discovered the treasure created a map to its location which they divided into four parts. One of the pirates was the grandfather of Guybrush's love interest, Elaine Marley, who has broken up with him. Guybrush charters a ship sailed by Captain Dread, and sets out to find the map pieces.

Guybrush's search takes him back and forth between three islands: Scabb, Phatt, and Booty. On Phatt Island he is imprisoned by order of Governor Phatt, who hopes to claim the bounty LeChuck has placed on him, but Guybrush manages to escape. On Booty Island he encounters Stan, a used ship salesman from the prior game who is now selling used coffins. He also reunites with Elaine, who is bitter toward him and says that their relationship was a mistake. Through various quests involving a Mardi Gras party, a spitting competition, a bloodhound, a drinking contest, a glass-bottom boat, a sunken ship's figurehead, rigged gambling, a library catalog, and temporarily resurrecting the dead, Guybrush manages to collect the map pieces. He takes them to diminutive cartographer Wally, who determines that Big Whoop is on Dinky Island. Wally and the map are soon kidnapped by LeChuck. Guybrush infiltrates LeChuck's fortress but is captured, and LeChuck places him and Wally in an elaborate deathtrap. They manage to escape, but Guybrush accidentally sets off an explosion which propels him to Dinky Island. There he encounters castaway Herman Toothrot, who he previously met on Monkey Island.

Navigating a mazelike jungle with the help of a talking parrot, Guybrush locates the site where Big Whoop is supposedly buried. He digs until he hits concrete, and uses dynamite to blast through it. Elaine hears the explosion from Booty Island and sets out to investigate, finding Guybrush dangling over a deep hole which he then falls down, winding up in an underground facility. LeChuck arrives, claims that he is Guybrush's brother, and proceeds to torture him using a voodoo doll. In the tunnels, Guybrush discovers an E ticket, a first aid station, a "lost parents" area with the skeletal remains of his parents, and an elevator leading to Mêlée Island, which he previously visited in The Secret of Monkey Island. He manages to create a voodoo doll of LeChuck, and dismembers his foe by tearing its leg off.

LeChuck begs Guybrush to remove his mask, revealing that he is actually Guybrush's creepy brother, Chuckie. Their reunion is interrupted by a workman, who says that "you kids" should not be there. The two brothers, now appearing as children, exit the tunnels together and meet their parents above-ground in the "Big Whoop" amusement park. Guybrush is confused, and Chuckie's eyes glow with evil energy. Back on Dinky Island, Elaine wonders if LeChuck has cast a spell over Guybrush.

Development

Origin
The idea of a sequel to The Secret of Monkey Island originated in that project's planning by its director, Lucasfilm Games employee Ron Gilbert. Gilbert envisioned The Secret of Monkey Island as the first of a trilogy of adventure games, although he hadn't fully developed the overarching narrative direction for the series at the time. The possibility of a second Monkey Island game was alluded to by Gilbert in a late 1990 interview with in-company newsletter The Adventurer, and he told  Retro Gamer in 2006 that "I knew there was going to be a sequel" before he completed work on The Secret of Monkey Island. He proceeded to conceive ideas specifically for Monkey Island 2 before Lucasfilm Games commenced the publication of the previous game. Gilbert remarked that his opportunity to develop the sequel came in part from the company's contemporary project management practices which he likened to the narrative setting of Lord of the Flies, as the staff enjoyed the capability to "[run] around and do whatever we wanted". Further inspiration for Monkey Island 2 inception stemmed from Lucasfilm Games staff's enthusiasm for exploring conceptual avenues not applied to The Secret of Monkey Island. Gilbert explained that, although the earlier game's team had been led to omit several of its design decisions from the title to complete it within deadline, "it didn't matter [...] because I could just save the work out and come back to it in the sequel".

According to Gilbert, Monkey Island 2 began due to his personal interest in expanding his work in the original game rather than due to commercially oriented suggestions from Lucasfilm Games' management. Gilbert commented that the game's origin would have been improbable in the latter case, as the company was unable to assess the viability of a potential sequel due to its then limited knowledge of the first title's sales performance. The initial uncertainty of the first game's commercial success also encouraged Gilbert to start the Monkey Island 2 project without express approval of the wider company. His intention was to deter a scenario wherein Lucasfilm Games' discontent with the market performance of the first game would prompt the company to abandon developing new Monkey Island titles for ventures with greater consumer appeal such as Star Wars licensed games. Gilbert eventually convinced Lucasfilm Games to commit to the creation of the sequel irrespective of its commercial viability, a decision which Gilbert attributed to the "simpler days" of that period of his involvement with the company. In 1990, around the time that the development of Monkey Island 2 was sanctioned, Lucasfilm Games and other Lucasfilm subsidiaries were reorganized into integrated divisions of the newly formed LucasArts Entertainment Company. Monkey Island 2 thus served as the first adventure title of the Lucasfilm game development branch to be produced under the LucasArts brand name. Development of Monkey Island 2: LeChuck's Revenge began shortly after The Secret of Monkey Islands release in October 1990. As with most of their contemporary releases, LucasArts both developed the sequel and self-published the game's originally issued edition.

Production

Monkey Island 2 was one of LucasArts' first games - along with Indiana Jones and the Fate of Atlantis - to conform to a new, more structured production template the company sought to commit its projects to.  This meant that a dedicated schedule was set for the development of the sequel, under which process further "rough due-dates" were decided and a fully recruited team was allotted to Monkey Island 2. The principal staff members from the original game reprised their duties for the creation of its sequel. Gilbert reassumed the role of project leader, and The Secret of Monkey Island co-designers, programmers and writers Tim Schafer and Dave Grossman also returned to work on Monkey Island 2 in their respective capacities. Grossman briefly disengaged from the game's production when LucasArts requested him to assist The Digs then-director Noah Falstein in the early development of that title. After concluding this assignment, Grossman resumed his work on Monkey Island 2 until its completion. Staff returning from The Secret of Monkey Island also included lead artist and cover illustrator Steve Purcell; animator Sean Turner; composer Michael Land; LucasArts playtesting supervisor Judith Lucero, who also authored the instruction manual for the game; and game tester James Hampton. At the same time, Monkey Island 2 was supplemented with newly hired personnel such as artists Peter Chan and Larry Ahern as well as a scripter-programmer. Shelley Day, formerly of Electronic Arts, was appointed to produce Monkey Island 2 at LucasArts alongside Indiana Jones and the Fate of Atlantis.

Describing the core aspects of Monkey Island 2 development in 2008, Rogue Leaders: The Story of LucasArts author Rob Smith wrote that the project was sophisticated design-wise and, at the same time, "from a technology standpoint, [the game was not] particularly complex". Monkey Island 2 was built atop the fifth revision of LucasArts' proprietary SCUMM engine, which was simultaneously used in the production of Indiana Jones and the Fate of Atlantis. The company had gradually modified the technology since its original use in their adventure game Maniac Mansion. By the time that Monkey Island 2 began production, the company had embedded in the engine a dedicated interpreter for the SCUMM scripting language that was internally dubbed SPUTUM and a number of background programs that managed the location of Monkey Island 2 objects and characters as well as simulated the activities of the latter in the game. This included FLEM, the code for the identification of interactive objects and the movement patterns of the in-game personalities, and BILE, a "cel-based animation emulator" that allowed artists to render motions for individual body parts of the characters. The variety of SCUMM's subset programs allowed the engine to maintain the execution of multiple script functions with regard to a given entity within the game, such as those handling the rendition of that asset's audiovisual data. Whereas the engine had been originally designed as cross-platform, Monkey Island 2 was developed around personal computers (PC) that used the MS-DOS operating system, as with LucasArts' other concurrently produced games.
 
Also revised was the graphical user interface from The Secret of Monkey Island which employed verb-based commands as means of player input. To advance the gameplay's accessibility, the Monkey Island 2 team upscaled the size of the point-and-click menu that provided the list of the commands, which was refined by the removal of "turn on" and "turn off" options. Further alterations to The Secret of Monkey Islands version of the interface included an overhaul of the on-screen player inventory, which replaced the items' formerly text-only descriptions with visual icons. In addition, the revised engine offered programmers shortcut commands for the coding of the objects that featured in the game. At the same time, according to Johnny L. Wilson of Computer Gaming World, a member of LucasArts' programming department admitted that even upon the exercise of this technique, they were led to contribute around nine man-months to finalize the object-oriented programming in Monkey Island 2. However, in 1992 Rik Haynes of CU Amiga commented that SCUMM's capacity as a high-level programming language was helpful to the creative staff members as it allowed them "to focus on being creative rather than worrying about technical mumbo jumbo".  Similarly, in 2013 Ron Gilbert recalled that the underlying functionalities of the SCUMM system enabled the staff to incorporate newly conceived ideas into the game's interactive environment directly after they were suggested, which thus introduced an aspect of iterative design in the production.

In 2006, Gilbert remarked that the overlap between the development assets for The Secret of Monkey Island and its sequel meant that both projects occurred continuously, as a singular creative process. As such, the staff carried over into the sequel the majority of their previously unrealized ideas that had been developed for the first game. Gilbert's assessment was later echoed by Grossman, who further noted that Monkey Island 2 underwent a smooth development cycle as a result of its genre's accommodation for games with cost-effective production values.  Specifically, he likened a typical adventure title of that period to a puppet theatre performance as opposed to a cinematic work with film-like qualities, and believed that the adoption of the former reference point allowed LucasArts to build the sequel's plotline and gameplay without excessive resources. Along with technology-based solutions optimizing the development, the company also decided on a "tight" approach to the distribution of its staff members that were assigned to Monkey Island 2. As a result, the creative personnel were allotted to small groups that worked across a series of planning sessions to establish the sequel's narrative and gameplay features. During development, the artistic staff were situated on a different floor of LucasArts' headquarters building from the location of the designers; the latter were thus required to pay frequent visits to the office of the graphics specialists to review their intermediary contributions. Although intended from its inception to exceed the scope of its predecessor, Rob Smith estimated that Monkey Island 2 ultimately involved around the same number of development staff as The Secret of Monkey Island. In retrospect, Gilbert recalled the number of personnel that worked on the sequel to be larger than that of his previous game, albeit "small enough that we all talked every day and everyone had a good understanding of the whole game being made". He added that the creation of Monkey Island 2 was devoid of disagreements within the team, and that they were able to resolve situational production-related concerns in the ordinary course of the development.

Three production phases, known as "passes" within the company, divided Monkey Island 2 development, as with LucasArts' other contemporary adventure games. As part of its streamlining of in-house development practices, LucasArts employed image scanning and digitization methods to generate assets for Monkey Island 2. In the first "pass", artists originally created hand-drawn images of environments that were set to feature in the game, termed "rooms", in the form of pencil sketches. The outline drawings were then processed through a Sharp color scanner and the resulting digitized graphics were submitted to a group of programmers to be input to the technological framework for the game. The latter task involved the setting of boundaries for the interactive space of a "room", its integration the material with the encoded algorithms for the game's dialogue tree mechanics, and the programming for the objects within the modeled scene. Johnny L. Wilson reported that the emphasis of the first "pass" was "[for] everything [to be] programmed as quickly as possible". The first phase produced an early build of Monkey Island 2 which featured monochrome scenes navigated by placeholder characters from a number of other then in-development LucasArts games. After this version was delivered LucasArts held an internal "pizza orgy" to commemorate the occasion, during which personnel from the wider company were involved in the initial playtesting of the game and were engaged to offer design input. The early build informed the work of LucasArts' marketing department on the artwork for the packaging materials for Monkey Island 2, in particular that of the cover.

In the second phase of production, output from the initial stage was revised, as the artists and programmers reiterated on and refined their earlier work. The sketch-based monochrome graphics were processed through the Photoshop graphics editing software on a Macintosh II computer and thus were reworked into more detailed chromatic images of the game's background scenery. The basic graphics and animations of the game's cast of characters were created with DeluxePaint Animation and later implemented along with the modified environmental visuals into the then current builds of Monkey Island 2. In average, the artists committed up to an entire day to the production of the revised graphics for an in-game scene; by contrast, they required a roughly one-hour timeframe to create the tentative form of the visuals. The resultant graphics materials were submitted to LucasArts' marketing department and served as the basis of their work on the game's promotion. As part of this effort, LucasArts provided publications such as Computer Gaming World with the then current builds of Monkey Island 2 and screenshots of its gameplay for press coverage. Also around this time LucasArts completed the packaging solution for Monkey Island 2: the marketing personnel incorporated still images of the provisional art assets for the game into the design of the reverse side for the product covering. Concurrently the company organized the exposure of the game at prospective trade shows and the involvement of focus groups in the game's development. In June 1991, LucasArts showed Monkey Island 2: LeChuck's Revenge, then temporarily titled The Secret of Monkey Island II, alongside Indiana Jones and the Fate of Atlantis at the Summer Consumer Electronics Show. That month, Paul Presley of The One estimated that the game "is still a long way from completion", and later in August, Amaya Lopez of Zero reported that the sequel was to be released for PCs and the Amiga in late 1991.

According to Johnny L. Wilson, the third and last phase required LucasArts to "put the absolute finishing touches" to the entirety of the previously developed material for Monkey Island 2. As production continued, personnel began to work overtime to bring the game's assets to completion, a trend which would extend to the company's subsequent games such as Day of the Tentacle. Schafer told Edge in 2009 that at the time, the staff members disregarded the risk of personal strain that came from the adoption of crunch time practices because most of them had shared similar past experiences during the time of their higher education, as an outgrowth of the necessity to reside in dormitories and study at underground facilities on campus territory. Summarizing his overview of Monkey Island 2s development, Wilson suggested that LucasArts' decision to realize the process as a threefold pattern proved to be "a mixed blessing": although intended to provide momentum to the overall production, the procedure only simplified the programmers' workload in the first phase, offset by "trade-offs" to the performance of the remaining staff members. However, Rob Smith retroactively indicated that the team maintained a "straightforward" pace of progress during development, in part due to the personnel's accrued familiarity with the nuances of the SCUMM system as a result of their past work. He specifically noted that the SCUMM engine's capabilities allowed them to introduce concepts, dialogues, and interactive scenes within Monkey Island 2 at all possible phases of the game's development, even directly ahead of its release. According to Smith, the convenience of the team's situation enabled them to conclude work on the sequel one year after its production was started. Gilbert asserted that the development staff did not encounter corporate pressure during their work on the game, and reported that the sequel's creation provided him with satisfaction, although "perhaps not as much as the first one".

Monkey Island 2: LeChuck's Revenge was originally released as a floppy disk-based title for IBM PCs as well as for MS-DOS and Mac OS in December 1991. Gilbert later remarked that LucasArts' choice of the release medium for the game, which was distributed on six floppy disks, led him to excise five planned scenes from Monkey Island 2 to ensure that it was compliant with the allotted size limitations. By the month of its initial release, the sequel's launch for the Amiga was delayed to early 1992, and U.S. Gold, LucasArts' product distributor in Europe, had assumed the position of the game's publisher in the relevant territories. The Amiga version was ultimately released in Summer 1992; the development house in charge of the conversion divided Monkey Island 2 into four sequential playable sections that were distributed across eleven floppy disks to adapt the game to the platform's memory constraints. Although CD-ROM releases of adventure games had become widespread by the time of Monkey Island 2s publication, Gilbert was unwilling to consider the idea to develop a modified version of the sequel for release on that format. His rationale was that the intricacies of the compact disc medium, such as a slower data transfer rate than that of contemporary high-end PCs' internal hard drives, would prove to be ill-suited to the developing standards of the adventure genre. LucasArts later carried over the revised SCUMM-based interface from Monkey Island 2 into the CD-ROM updated version of The Secret of Monkey Island, released in 1992 for IBM PCs. That year, Gilbert left LucasArts alongside Shelley Day to co-found Humongous Entertainment, a developer of edutainment games that were intended for younger audiences. After similarly departing from the former company in 1994, Grossman moved to join Gilbert in his new venture, and Schafer remained at LucasArts as a designer until 2000 when he and several other staff members left to establish Double Fine.

Design and writing
According to Ron Gilbert and Tim Schafer, their overriding idea for Monkey Island 2 was to build an expansion of The Secret of Monkey Islands narrative scope and gameplay elements. With regard to the latter, Gilbert wanted the sequel to represent a more open-ended adventure game than that the previous title, which involved navigation of confined insular spaces. Consequently, he decided on exploration of multiple islands as the overarching feature of Monkey Island 2s gameplay. In August 1991, Gilbert described the then currently-developed sequel as the most nonlinear game that was under production at LucasArts during that period. Competing games in the genre such as Sierra On-Line's King's Quest IV served as a reference point for Gilbert: he intended the sequel to forgo those titles' tendency to render the protagonist dead upon the recognition of player-made mistakes in favor of a model that did not provide for this exacting element. This approach coincided with his earlier concept that had been applied in The Secret of Monkey Island, whose design was exclusive of events that prompted the player character's death so as to promote an emphasis on the title's narrative and puzzle-solving aspects. In the game, this is realized by Guybrush telling the story to his love interest Elaine Marley as a flashback; whenever a decision would lead to Guybrush's death (such as not escaping LeChuck's deathtrap), Elaine will interject that this can't have happened since Guybrush is alive telling her the story, allowing the player to retry. One of Gilbert's other ideas was that the average level of challenge in contemporary adventure games was insufficient and derogatory for their play value, and he thus sought to introduce an increased overall degree of difficulty to Monkey Island 2.

An adjacent concern of the team, as expressed by both Gilbert and Dave Grossman, was to ensure the accessibility of the sequel's gameplay to the widest variety of players regardless of their ability to progress in the game. To this end, Gilbert decided to introduce the concept of alternative levels of difficulty in Monkey Island 2, under which premise the title would adapt the composition as well as the complexity of its specific playable sections according to the player's choice of a preferred gameplay mode from a prompt at the start of the game. He initially wanted the sequel to provide players with a selection of three escalating grades of gameplay difficulty, a feature which was incorporated into the originally unveiled build of Monkey Island 2. The resultant game featured only two options of gameplay, specifically the streamlined and abridged incarnation of Monkey Island 2 dubbed "Monkey Lite", and the mainline, complex iteration of the title that was termed "Monkey Classic". Writing in the summer 1992 issue of The Adventurer, Noah Falstein explained that the former rendition of Monkey Island 2 was set to give players a cursory overview of the game's basics, as an invocation of the content offering within the full-fledged version of the game. He described the creation of the dual difficulty system to be a demanding endeavor for the team, in that they were required to preclude repetition in the design of its two variations and to differentiate the identity of each solution to the gameplay. Falstein concluded that Monkey Island 2s capacity as a twofold interactive experience served to make the sequel appealing both to audiences who newly encountered the Monkey Island franchise and to skilled players who expected a testing new series entry. Similarly, Gilbert later stated his belief of the feature's continued relevance for modern adventure game design, as he perceived a growth of casually oriented audiences among present-day players who appreciated gameplay avenues that accounted for those people's currently decreasing free time.

In 2015, Gilbert remarked that the team's design practices proved to be unaffected by the addition of the difficulty level dichotomy, as they had opted to eschew the opportunity to develop the baseline archetype of Monkey Island 2 by incrementally building on the game's simplified model. Instead, an inverse method was adopted: the development staff originally implemented the challenging version of Monkey Island 2 as the core template of the game and then reformulated their initial output into an abbreviated counterpart. To that end, they conducted a gradual review of the planned layout of mandatory player-driven situations in Monkey Island 2, under which process the solutions to each of the mainline game's puzzles were reconsidered. Gilbert gave the example that, in response to discovering a puzzle that qualified players to obtain a key to a locked in-game doorway after their progress through numerous interim events, the team would render the passage readily open to expedite the resolution of that part of the game. To accomplish a "presolved" adaptation of the game in its lower-difficulty iteration, they identified compound progressions of puzzles within the design of Monkey Island 2 and then excised or modified those sequences' elements to condense the respective segments of the title. Rather than to substantially reimagine the sequel's story and gameplay for its compressed variation, the designers' point of focus was merely to determine certain sections of Monkey Island 2 that were conducive to revisions so as to retain a satisfactory degree of momentum for the overall play experience. Gilbert recalled that the game's underlying technology allowed LucasArts to alter and adjust elements of the title on an impromptu basis. Gilbert found this practice to exhibit his preference to base his games on broadly defined plans, as opposed to precise design documents, and admitted that he would struggle to direct a similar work to Monkey Island 2 in the face of formalized development procedures.

Whereas the work of The Secret of Monkey Islands team built on Gilbert's own concepts and outlines that had been developed prior to that game's production, the design of Monkey Island 2 was a more collaborative process. The creation of the game's puzzles involved the game's principal writers and programmers, whose output Rik Haynes described as "funny and bizarre". For example, Schafer was responsible for the game's event that engaged players to win a contest that required the participants to spit their saliva across the longest distance, a challenge that he believed to be unique in contrast to those that featured in other adventure games at the time. Artists were also encouraged to submit their opinions in the course of the planning process. Grossman recalled that the staff held the corresponding meetings in a confined working space, and "those sessions often became hilarious enough to be dangerous, with me asthmatically coughing up my own brain from laughing too much". Gilbert maintained the management of the design: he used the MicroPlanner X-Pert software on a Macintosh computer to generate schematic diagrams that depicted the arrangement of the puzzles in the game, or in his words "Puzzle Dependecy Charts". He employed this method to plan divergent structures of the required solutions to the puzzles as models of overarching and situational milestones that players were to advance through in Gilbert's games such as Monkey Island 2. As part of this technique, Gilbert also laid out specific scenarios in the title that featured successions of interactive problems, which were designed in reverse: the premises of the first and intermediary elements were recursively inferred from the rationale of the final logical step. Taken as singular entities, these puzzle sequences were then aligned into nonlinear representations akin to flowcharts, wherein the solution of the initial unit in the configuration segued into unrelated branching correlations of conditions for player-made progress that were constructed to culminate at a common in-game destination. From that point of convergence, a further diagram of the same type would be established and extended into subsequent, similarly ordered schemes; the reiteration of those patterns formed the aggregate framework of puzzles in Gilbert's projects at LucasArts, including Monkey Island 2.

In retrospect, Grossman remarked that the team's starting point in the design of specific interactive problems in Monkey Island 2 was to mimic the approach of a player to those challenges from the standpoint of everyday logic. In a 2006 interview with Retro Gamer, he gave an overview of the wider planning algorithm in terms of a speculative puzzle that involved Monkey Island 2 character Captain Kate. From this perspective, the team began by setting an in-game objective of stealing an item from the character. They proceeded to identify every realistic solution to the situation–which included the opportunity for the player character to covertly embezzle the item or to coerce Captain Kate into yielding the object–and gradually forwent truistic prospects for the players' progress until the exhaustion of such ideas. Provided that those options were entirely discarded, the team moved to devise an unorthodox new avenue for the resolution of the puzzle: in Grossman's example, it required players to engender a situation in the title that led to the arrest of Captain Kate in order for the character's belongings to become accessible. The designers' consequent goal was to develop the logic of events within which the intended outcome could eventuate. As outlined by Grossman, those criteria guided for the team's entire work on the development of puzzles for Monkey Island 2. Gilbert recalled that the sequel's gameplay segments were arranged around the concept of the game's multiple settings, and he described the result as "a complicated web of puzzles [...] [that] kind of jumbled all around", in contrast to The Secret of Monkey Islands more linear approach. He also noted that the puzzle structure in the sequel was distinguished by its greater reliance on "dialogue puzzles", a term that alluded to nonlinear scenarios of player-driven conversations with the game's characters which featured alternative response options.

Retro Gamer reported that the team's co-authorship of the design for the game contributed to the increased complexity of its puzzles, including the emergence of the latter's consecutive successions in Monkey Island 2. Although Gilbert remarked that the sequel epitomized his accrued experience and practices in attempting to create a comprehensive template of an adventure game, he had also stated that certain puzzles and scenes in the game qualified as redundant in retrospect. Specifically, Gilbert, Schafer and Grossman cited concerns with the puzzle wherein players were meant to use a simian entity that they had captured earlier in the game as an improvised wrench to open a passageway to a previously restricted location, in an allusion to the English language term monkey wrench. Grossman explained that, whereas the intended wordplay was relevant with regard to the game's domestic audience due to the underlying phrase's predominant circulation in the United States, the equivoque did not apply culturally to territories beyond the North American market and thus was difficult to translate into the overseas versions of the game. Gilbert later described the result of this misconception as his least accomplished design of a puzzle and apologized to players for its addition to the game. The experience led him to realize that the prospect of his games' distribution beyond the American market would necessitate cultural adaptation of their contextual elements, an aspect Gilbert has attempted to account for in his subsequent works. Gilbert nevertheless stated his belief that he was able to materialize the vast majority of his plans for Monkey Island 2 in the released version of the game. However, previously, after the game's release, Gilbert had stated that he "[was] still trying to figure out how to get everything I want into an adventure game".

As with the game's predecessor, the puzzles in Monkey Island 2 were created prior to its storyline. Around that time that the project commenced, the vast majority of the plot's details were unestablished. Gilbert's diagrammatic framework of the puzzles supplied the general layout of the game's plot-oriented events, and the team then "made [the storyline] up as we went". He believed that the theme of revenge served as a universally resonant narrative premise, and the story was thus based around LeChuck's pursuance of vengeance against Guybrush Threepwood in reprisal for the former's loss in their confrontation in the previous game. In 2014, Gilbert acknowledged Monkey Island 2 to be "a little bit dark" intrinsically and simultaneously conducive to comedic writing; earlier he had remarked that he regarded the game as an avenue to realize the unexplored humorous material that had been planned to feature in its predecessor. As with the previous game, Gilbert distributed the writing duties for discrete sections of the game between Schafer and Grossman, and assigned each of them to individual scenes and characters in accordance with the designers' comic sensibilities. Several months after the game's release, Schafer described Monkey Island 2 as a parodic game which employed ironic subversion of its own archetypical traits and those of other contemporary computer games. He explained that "every time that you expected a payoff, [the game] would do something that was kind of a non-payoff" and that "[the game's] taste of humor [was] not for everybody". Among references to non-interactive media in the game, LucasArts added a tribute to the Pirates of the Caribbean attraction - which provided the stylistic inspiration for the first game - as well as numerous nods to the Indiana Jones and Star Wars franchises, and an allusion to the James Bond films. From the conceptualized story foundation, the team developed the game's characters. Gilbert noted that certain returning characters from the previous game were carried over due to their popularity among the staff, and others, such as the Voodoo Lady, were included to reinforce particular motifs in the story. Rik Haynes commented that, aside from the conversations with the characters that were added solely to facilitate the title's atmosphere, specific dialogues were written to telegraph suggestions to players for advancing through the game.
		
Reconciling the planned puzzles for the game with its narrative was a major point of focus for the designers of Monkey Island 2. Rik Haynes reported that Gilbert "was so absorbed by the process, in fact, that he even solved tricky problems in his sleep". According to Gilbert, contiguous suggestions that addressed the issue of the game's playability came from LucasArts game testers as they reviewed various development builds of Monkey Island 2. He recalled an instance during development when Judith Lucero and members of her team submitted to him an e-mail that detailed an extensive proposal for an overhaul of Monkey Island 2'''s then current version. James Hampton stated that this document, internally dubbed the "Giant "D" ("D" for "Design") Bug", was collaboratively developed by him and the game's other testers and offered "our ideas and reactions to the earliest builds of the game". Their recommendations particularly provided for additions to the game's length and difficulty, and specified edits to its storyline and puzzles. Discussing Gilbert's response, Hampton noted that he encouraged agency among the development staff over the course of the creative process and thus approved of the testing personnel's considerations. As a result, a number of their concepts were implemented in the finalized game, such as the idea for "screwball" non-playable sequences depicting the player character during travel between the islands in the game's setting on an onscreen map of the overworld, as a pastiche of analogous scenes in the Indiana Jones films. Also carried over from the proposal was the conceit for a library location with a multitude of references to the game's events and easter eggs from the team that were included in the area via the element of an interactive card catalog. Reminiscing on the game testers' contributions, Gilbert said that they "have a unique perspective on the game and poke not only at the bugs but also the design and the thought process of playing a game" and "are a critical gear in the machinery that makes up making a game".

A further aspect of the development wherein Gilbert sought design input from LucasArts staff members beyond the principal creative team was the planning of the game's ending. He had struggled to conceive a satisfactory finale for the sequel, and postponed the consideration of this problem repeatedly during the game's production. As such, by the time that LucasArts moved to finalize Monkey Island 2, Gilbert's concern with the development of the sequel's conclusion was renewed. James Hampton claimed that a meeting was convened to establish the game's climax including LucasArts game testers, in the process of which his suggestion for an ending akin to that of St. Elsewheres series finale - which revealed the events of that show to exist in a dream-like fictional universe - provided the basis for the closing scenes of the game. Gilbert stated the idea for the game's denouement came from his ongoing anxiety over the lack of an appropriate concept in the face of the nearing completion of the title's development. He explained that he imagined the resultant rendition of the ending spontaneously, when "one day, literally laying in bed on a Saturday morning, it just kind of hit me [...] how [the game had] to end". He later indicated that the ending was intended to convey a metaphor rather than to be subject to a literal interpretation. Schafer regarded the finale of Monkey Island 2 as an outgrowth of the game's subversive brand of humor, and admitted that the climax was contrary to popular expectations. Gilbert acknowledged that the sequel's conclusion has proven to be controversial among players since its release, and that he had planned the ending to invoke conflicted sentiments among the title's audiences "from day one". He explained that he purposely engendered the provocative nature of the ending in an attempt to elicit differing public perceptions thereof, a reaction which he believed to be evidence of creative accomplishment. Although Gilbert said in 2015 that the finale provided "perfect" closure for the game's storyline, he had conceded after his departure from LucasArts that the ending's ambiguousness complicated any plans of a direct continuation. Specifically, he expressed his belief that the development team for the next series installment, The Curse of Monkey Island, "would mention that I had made their life hell". Gilbert nevertheless asserted that the completion of the Monkey Island 2 project marked his discovery of a hypothetical plot device with which he could build on the sequel's narrative and finish the overarching story arc of his planned adventure game trilogy.

Artistic design

		
Shortly before the release of Monkey Island 2, LucasArts art department supervisor Collette Michaud offered the perspective that the creation of the game's visuals was representative of the company's then-ongoing push into modernizing its graphics production pipeline. The company allotted a larger number of artists than those of its past projects to Monkey Island 2, who were divided into two groups: background artists and animation specialists. This staff layout was the result of LucasArts's wider decision to increase the aggregate amount of its planned titles' art resources, mandated by the evolving technological demands of the computer game industry.  Specifically, the VGA visual interface had become the graphics standard for high-end personal computers and the latter's hard drive components had dropped in price by the time that Monkey Island 2 was growing close to completion. Peter Chan, for whom the title marked his debut in video game development, remarked that LucasArts productions lacked the position of an art director at the time, in keeping with the company's small-scale distribution of its staff resources. The duties of lead artists were assigned to him and Steve Purcell, designations that Chan said to be perfunctory, as "for us, I think because it was so new, lead artist just meant the guy who was stuck doing most of the art". Purcell mentioned that, whereas the mainline EGA-compatible version of the previous game was rendered in a limited palette of 16 colors, the company's adoption of the VGA format's 256-color scheme for Monkey Island 2 meant that "we had all the colors we needed". As the only returning staff member among Monkey Island 2s head artists, Purcell sought to ensure the overall visual consistency between the game and its predecessor. A series of lengthy planning discussions guided the creation of the game's audiovisuals, which were fashioned to complement the game's plotline. Overall, Rik Haynes estimated the resulting graphics assets to comprise around 6.4 million pixels of on-screen visual information.

Haynes reported that the art team's concern with enhancing the graphical quality of Monkey Island 2 led them to consider atypical devices for realizing the game's static visuals. Around that time, competing companies Sierra On-Line and Dynamix had released several titles whose graphics were generated from scanned images and digitized live-action footage. The success of those titles prompted LucasArts to incorporate a scanning-based method into the production of their game's visuals. Reminiscing on that development, Purcell explained the artists' capability to initially model the in-game locations on paper and then to implement the images digitally lent them "a greater range". After experimenting with various art media in the creation of the environmental paintings, LucasArts developed a process that involved an amalgam of graphical techniques. Initially, the artists used colored pen markers to draw a rough representation of a scene–an approach originated by Chan–whose details they then augmented and reinforced by applying paint. Thereby they finalized the overlaid drawing with colored pencils, utilized to eliminate "soft edges". Upon the digitization of those visualizations, LucasArts added further adjustments and effects "not easily achieved with traditional painting methods" to the resulting pictures with proprietary graphics software. The background artwork was primarily developed by Chan and partly created by Purcell, who was responsible for locations such as the interior of Wally B. Feed's cabin in Woodtick. Sean Turner also painted the visual designs for certain scenes in the game. Purcell sought to impart depth to the background graphics by adding elements that suggested the presence of a foreground visual dimension in the on-screen depiction of settings such as the Bloody Lip Bar, a location which the player character visits in Woodtick. Citing that same scene, Purcell remarked that he attempted to provide the environmental visuals with humorous imagery, which, with respect to Purcell's example, meant details "like the spitoon with overshot loogies all over the doorframe". He was also inclined to introduce anachronistic visual elements in the background artwork, although one of those elements, a "50's era jukebox" that was planned to feature in the Bloody Lip Bar, was omitted from the final game.

For the animated graphics in Monkey Island 2, Ron Gilbert sought to ensure that the movements of the game's characters were rendered in a "simple and cartoony" style, in keeping with the previous game. The team of artists that worked on that aspect of the game was led by Turner, a former employee of Lucasfilm subsidiary Industrial Light & Magic, and was also composed of Michaud, Larry Ahern, Mike McLaughlin and Steve Purcell. Turner's primary responsibility concerned shaping the aesthetics and stylistic direction of the dynamic visuals in the game. An experienced specialist in traditional animation, he wanted his work with 2D digital visuals to exceed the limitations of the computer graphics medium. Turner utilized two distinct procedures to develop his output: the artwork was alternately built with software tools in DeluxePaint Animation and scanned from sequences of hand-drawn cel images. The second algorithm was primarily employed to produce animations that contained large objects; Michaud explained that the artists found their efforts to be streamlined when such assets were originally depicted on paper and then imported into a suitable form for digital manipulation. LucasArts still used the software-based solution to generate the majority of the characters' animations, whose creation the art staff believed to be expedited when realized under a computer interface. Michaud stated that Turner's professional background and humorous sensibilities inspired the individual contributions of his team, "allowing them to open up and have some fun with the animations". Larry Ahern also remarked that Gilbert instructed the animators by providing them with lists describing the game's entities that were required to move in a specific scene. Ahern recalled that, in the initial period of his engagement with Monkey Island 2, he was unable to discern the in-game context for his work on a particular event in the title due to Gilbert's abstract directions. According to Ahern, he "tried asking questions about it, and [Gilbert] said, 'Just do this, this, this, and this, laundry list, check it off', and I got real frustrated with that". He then enquired with Schafer and Grossman about the purpose of the character actions that he was tasked to choreograph. Ahern explained that the co-designers proceeded to describe to him the intended effect of the respective scenes, and "I'd say, 'Oh, well, wouldn't it be more fun if I did it this way', and they'd go, 'Yeah, that'd be even better. Go do that'". As a result, Ahern asked Schafer and Grossman to negotiate Gilbert's approval for his proposal, a concern which the two agreed to address.

	
Aside from his immediate role in the graphics production for Monkey Island 2, Steve Purcell was responsible the game's cover artwork. The preparation of the game's packaging involved Collette Michaud, Purcell's then-girlfriend and future wife. Although at the time that the game's branding was devised, the majority of the packaging solutions for planned LucasArts products were conceived by the company's executive officers, Purcell stated that the project leaders for those titles were strongly inclined to promote their own vision for the styling of the games' covers. Purcell specified that for Monkey Island 2, Gilbert requested a cover illustration resembling that of a classic book. Purcell recalled that his capacity as an artist on the first two Monkey Island games enabled him to readily identify the prospective cover's core visual elements. Continuing a trend from The Secret of Monkey Island, Purcell painted sketches that displayed his concepts for the cover's presentation to establish the basic design of the artwork. Purcell noted that those pictures were intended to convey general ideas that he wanted to bring to completion, rather than to comprise fully formed illustrations. After Purcell delivered the paintings, LucasArts selected a satisfactory cover archetype and tasked him to "transfer the sketch to the board". The finished template image for the game's cover was an oil painting by Purcell drawn on a linen canvas. With respect to the scale of the painting, Purcell decided to "do it big – two by three feet", and he spent a month developing the resultant artwork. Michaud posed in costume as a model for the cover's depictions of Guybrush Threepwood and LeChuck to provide Purcell with a reference point for the light distribution in the artwork. According to Purcell, the cover's visuals were meant to reveal to players lifesized representations of the game's characters and setting, portrayed without the graphical limitations of the title's underlying technology. Described by Retro Gamer as reminiscent of an N.C. Wyeth book illustration, Monkey Island 2s cover art has garnered a positive public reception since the game's release, which Purcell stated "makes all the effort worthwhile". Purcell still possesses the original painting of the cover, which is currently placed in his office.

The game's artists and animators - as well as its composers - collaborated with LucasArts programmers to shape an engaging realization of the game's scenario, stylized to utilize cinematic techniques such as scrolling panoramas of the title's environments and proportional character scaling. Less than a year after the launch of the game, Dave Grossman described aspects of its presentation with the term "interactive cartoon", in that the title was conducive to "crazy and cartoony" interactive sequences. He cited the example of the game's sequence wherein Largo LaGrande extorted money and valuables from Guybrush Threepwood on the bridge leading to Woodtick, an event which Grossman said to prompt players "[to save] the game at that point so they could go back and watch it a few times". Peter Chan said that the artistic direction of Monkey Island 2 was already decided when he joined its team, which focused his efforts on attempting to mimic existing visual references, although the corporate culture of LucasArts at the time allowed him opportunities to introduce unplanned graphical elements in the game. In contrast, Ahern retrospectively voiced his discontent with the game's visual style, which he said was uneven because of the artists' capability to add stylistically disparate graphics assets to the title without immediate supervision. He explained that "there was nobody officially art directing [the game] and coming in and saying, 'No, that character's off-model, or that needs to look more like this'". Ahern was frustrated with this situation, which he believed to be the source of a major stylistic dissonance between the game's individual scenes. As a result of this experience, when Ahern was appointed to serve as an animator for Day of the Tentacle, he requested LucasArts for the authority to institute uniform design criteria for that title's art team, so as to facilitate a cohesive artistic process. Conversely, Grossman later indicated that Monkey Island 2s artwork–along with its music–imparted "a terrific sense of place" and a "tremendously cinematic" ambiance to the game.

Music

The score for Monkey Island 2: LeChuck's Revenge was composed by Michael Land in conjunction with his former college housemate Peter McConnell and high school friend Clint Bajakian, both newly hired by LucasArts to work on the game. The game's music was developed on a Macintosh II computer using Digital Performer and reformulated into PC-compatible MIDI tracks via a dedicated sound program that McConnell had written as his first job at the company. The in-game arrangements of the compositions employed recordings of the composers' live performances of the tracks over a MIDI keyboard and a music sequencer. Land, McConnell and Bajakian split the scoring responsibilities between themselves in equal measure, and did not allot the title of lead composer to a specific musician. McConnell likened their collective's working dynamic to that of a professional band: the members were willing to exchange their duties in writing music for the game's individual locations, and created some of the tracks collaboratively. As with the previous series game, Michael Land coordinated his contributions with Ron Gilbert, who nevertheless was largely disengaged from the music's development. After relating to Land a general request to compose music driven by Calypso-inspired percussion, Gilbert refrained from further involvement, as he gave significant credence to Land's professional capabilities. Describing his area of focus, Land remarked that "from the beginning of the game, I wanted the music to sound like what you'd hear coming out of a radio if you were walking down a street on a Caribbean Island". Although the soundtrack of Monkey Island 2 incorporated leitmotifs, their use in the game eschewed an emphasis on character-related tracks that McConnell stated to be typical of film scores. Instead, he and his colleagues utilized the musical device to convey an invocation of a "pirate reggae" aesthetic across the individual compositions. The trio thus sought to establish an overriding thematic direction that disassociated the players' perception of the tracks from their attribution to the characters. The composers only broke away from that paradigm when preparing music that pertained to notable members of the game's cast such as the Voodoo Lady.Monkey Island 2: LeChuck's Revenge served as the first LucasArts game to use Interactive Music Streaming Engine (iMUSE), the company's proprietary adaptive music engine that was co-designed by Land and McConnell. The technology originated from Land's frustration with the implementation of The Secret of Monkey Islands music, whose integration with the title's gameplay he believed to be unsatisfactory. By the time that McConnell was recruited by LucasArts, Land had envisioned an audio sequencing system that could construct a flexible progression of a given soundtrack's compositions in an interactive environment. Land engaged him to collaborate on this concept, and McConnell later commented that "we made a very good design team in realizing and expanding on this vision". According to McConnell, the composers' reference for the iMUSE system was a speculative image of a pit orchestra in a musical whose conductor closely observed the enactment of the scored material and could "direct virtuoso musicians to make smooth transitions to any place in the music at any time, in a way that is, well, musical". The resultant solution allowed the compositions in the game to dynamically alter in response to the playable character's interaction with a specific environment or situation in Monkey Island 2. The iMUSE technology enabled the game to feature progressive music arrangements that adapted to the events throughout the course of the game's story, as well as logical transitions from one track to another, and provided for several other sound engineering functionalities. Describing the summarized effect of those features when applied in practice, Gilbert commented that "the [score] starts at the beginning and ends at the end of the game, and is just one ever-evolving piece of music".

Land and McConnell spent nine months on the creation of the iMUSE system's first incarnation, an integrated framework of audio drivers that governed the engine's various capabilities. McConnell recalled that LucasArts staff was initially confused as to the classification of the technology, whose subset programs and their associated MIDI track data "took up an entire floppy disk in a five-disk game". In reaction, McConnell and Land devised an identifiable designation for the system and proceeded to explicate their design to LucasArts personnel, which clarified the issue. McConnell remarked that, although he and Land were confident in the practicability of the iMUSE system during its inception, the composers found the application of its initial version to be very complicated. Bajakian cited major difficulties in ensuring that the encoded sound and music data were compatible with the available variety of sound cards on the computer hardware market. McConnell stated that the technology was required to undergo several iterations across five years from the release of Monkey Island 2 to become suitable for widespread use by LucasArts audio programmers. However, he noted that the core engine managed an average delivery of high-end audio performance during its host titles' gameplay, which helped to obscure the system's underlying complexity from the staff. Interviewed by Rob Smith in 2008, LucasArts then general manager Kelly Flock stated that the iMUSE technology marked the introduction of a novel avenue for the designers to mediate the relationship between the players' actions and the background music in a game. He noted that, in past adventure titles, the protagonist's appearance in a location within the game triggered a looping composition with a static structure that was divorced from the player-driven events in the scene. According to Flock, Land and McConnell's system contrasted this trend by accounting for the frequency of the player character's visits to an area in the game and their subsequent actions therein, in response to which the engine would alter the music to suit the circumstances of current gameplay segment and apply sound effects that were appropriate. Flock stated that Land was able to build up suspense in sections of the game with aural manipulations, a concept that the prievous LucasArts products did not incorporate. In commercializing the iMUSE system, LucasArts chose not to license its exploitation to competing companies, and instead appropriated the technology by patenting it for internally developed titles, which led the engine to perpetuate as a commonplace feature of SCUMM-based adventure games. Flock summarized that Land and McConnell's work was critical to the design of the ambiance in those titles and labeled it as "probably the single most important technology that was developed [at LucasArts]".

Special edition

As with The Secret of Monkey Island, LucasArts released a remake of the sequel with updated audiovisuals titled Monkey Island 2: Special Edition for the PlayStation 3, iPhone, iPod Touch, Microsoft Windows, and Xbox 360 in July 2010. The Mac OS X version has not yet been released, while the iOS version was retired in March 2015. The special edition includes updated graphics, updated high-quality audio engine, new voice-overs, additional content such as concept art, and an in-game hint system. The "lite" mode from the original game ("for game reviewers") has been omitted. Further, the original introductory sequence with the main musical theme has been removed, purportedly because it displayed credits for the original game, now outdated. Players can opt to switch from the updated version into the original at any time during the game, though an option allows players to retain the voice-overs of the remake. Players can opt to use the original point-and-click control scheme, or can directly control the movements of Guybrush using a control pad or similar device. The remake was announced by LucasArts during their annual Game Developers Conference on March 10, 2010, with the previous creators of the adventures, Ron Gilbert, Tim Schafer and Dave Grossman, in attendance. The trio of game designers have recorded a commentary track for the Special Edition that can be brought up in many locations, using silhouettes in the fashion of Mystery Science Theater 3000 overlaid on the graphics. Craig Derrick announced on a new interface that was in the vein of The Curse of Monkey Islands and a return of the original voice cast, including Dominic Armato as Guybrush, Alexandra Boyd as Elaine, Earl Boen as LeChuck, and even Neil Ross as Wally. Phil LaMarr was also confirmed as Dread and Tom Kane as additional voices.Monkey Island 2: Special Editions production was overseen by Craig Derrick and his team at LucasArts, known internally as "Team 3", which had been responsible for the remake of the first Monkey Island game. Derrick, a devoted enthusiast of the series, had sought an opportunity to participate in the franchise since the start of his employment at LucasArts, who at the time were disinterested in adventure game development. This situation led Derrick to face difficulties in negotiating an approval for his proposal to recreate The Secret of Monkey Island with the company's management due to their uncertainty about the financial feasibility of renewing LucasArts' former association with the genre, whose popularity they assumed to be in decline. After the successful release of The Secret of Monkey Island: Special Edition in 2009, Derrick was able to readily convince LucasArts to pursue the idea for a remake of Monkey Island 2. By this time that this decision was sanctioned, the majority of staff from the team of The Secret of Monkey Island: Special Edition was already occupied with another project. To compensate, LucasArts augmented the team for Monkey Island 2: Special Edition with staff from the company's foreign departments, and assigned the majority of the production duties to its Singapore division. To match the scope and complexity of the original 1991 title, LucasArts was led to leverage a greater amount of development resources for the renewed counterpart of Monkey Island 2 than for the previous remake. According to Derrick, the increased workload was mitigated by his colleagues' accumulated experience and access to technological solutions that had been introduced for The Secret of Monkey Island: Special Edition. He explained that those accrued assets enabled LucasArts to materialize an authentic recreation of Monkey Island 2 and supplement it with new functionalities in the same timeframe during which the completed iteration of the first remake was crafted. Those additions included the feature that enabled the playback in the game of the background audio commentary by Gilbert, Schafer and Grossman, recorded for the remake at the 2010 Game Developers Conference. Derrick had planned to procure the designers' engagement in the creation of a similar commentary track for The Secret of Monkey Island: Special Edition, but was unable to proceed with this incentive due to scheduling setbacks on the side of an unidentified party. Derrick attributed the implementation of the feature in the remake of Monkey Island 2 to the distribution of its development between LucasArts' San Francisco and Singapore departments. He mentioned that, although this type of delegated work caused certain difficulties in the teams' collaboration, the Singapore division had been previously involved with certain aspects of The Secret of Monkey Island: Special Edition and thus was able to coordinate an efficient approach to those issues. Derrick commented the result of this distributed process satisfied his expectations. Prior to the game's release, Gilbert reported to have been pleased with the remake's rendition of the gameplay and technical elements of Monkey Island 2, and remarked that Monkey Island 2: Special Editions capability to allow for the instant transition between the game's new and original audiovisuals "really showed the care, love, and respect that LucasArts has for these games".

 Reception 
SalesMonkey Island 2: LeChuck's Revenge was highly anticipated; Amiga Power called it the most eagerly awaited game of 1992. According to Ron Gilbert, Monkey Island 2 and its predecessor "sold well, but Sierra Online and King's Quest were still kicking our ass completely!" A writer for Next Generation noted that the games were "relatively minor hit[s]" in the United States, but became blockbusters on the PC and the Amiga throughout Europe. Conversely, Edge reported that both games "sold very poorly on release". Designer Tim Schafer said that Monkey Island 2 sold about 25,000 copies, despite its being released at a time when LucasArts was "really excited if we sold 100,000 copies of a PC graphic adventure". Following the underperformance of Monkey Island 2, Schafer recalled that the management came and told them that Monkey was a failure and that they should make something else. He speculated that the Monkey Island series' reputation grew as a result of software piracy. According to Schafer, the pressure to develop a more commercially viable game ultimately led to the creation of Full Throttle, which became the first LucasArts adventure to sell one million units.

ReviewsMonkey Island 2 received consistently high reviews for all versions, 95% from Amiga Computing for the Amiga version, 96% from Computer and Video Games for the PC version. When Kixx XL rereleased Monkey Island 2 as a budget game, the reviews remained high getting 91% from CU Amiga. The game is still considered very high quality with contemporary reviewers scoring the game highly. Monkey Island 2 is often considered one of the greatest in the point-and-click genre, and it still stands up well against modern adventure game titles. The game holds a rating of 90% on the review aggregator site GameRankings.Monkey Island 2: LeChuck's Revenge was rated highly for several reasons. The game is considered user friendly as it has a "lite" mode. This allowed beginners to play the game at an easier setting. The overall difficulty of both modes is also considered to be good. The redesign in controls, such as the fewer verbs and graphical inventory were rated well as increasing the game's ease of use. Music in Monkey Island 2 was noted for its use of the iMUSE system. Reviewers noted that for the first time the sound is an integral part of the atmosphere. Graphically, the game was considered an improvement over its predecessor, with reviewers very impressed. It is also noted by critics that the developers of Monkey Island 2 made using the Amiga version's 11 floppy disks relatively smooth, but also noted that installing the game on a hard drive is recommended.

In 1992 Computer Gaming World named it the year's best adventure game, praising its "challenging puzzles and wonderful sense of humor, along with a stunning visual presentation". In 1996 the magazine ranked it as the 74th best game of all time. In 1994, PC Gamer UK named Monkey Island 2 the fourth best computer game of all time. The editors wrote: "Anyone who claims to have an interest in adventuring cannot afford to be without this". In 1996, GamesMaster ranked the game 29th on their "Top 100 Games of All Time". In 2011, Adventure Gamers named Monkey Island 2 the eighth-best adventure game ever released.

In a celebration of the series 30th anniversary, Ron Gilbert shared secrets from its original source code during a video conversation with the Video Games History Foundation. These included early character prototypes, deleted scenes, unused animations and alternative game environments from the first two games.

Special Edition
The Special Edition'' was given a score of B+ by Gaming Bus; the site stated that there was more music and it was of higher quality, the graphics were improved, there was additional content, and the core game was still intact, though the hints were too helpful and there were some problems with controls.

References

1991 video games
Adventure games
Amiga games
Cancelled Sega CD games
DOS games
IOS games
FM Towns games
Fiction about Louisiana Voodoo
LucasArts games
Classic Mac OS games
Monkey Island
MacOS games
PlayStation 3 games
PlayStation Network games
Point-and-click adventure games
SCUMM games
ScummVM-supported games
U.S. Gold games
Video game sequels
Video games about pirates
Video games scored by Clint Bajakian
Video games scored by Michael Land
Video games scored by Peter McConnell
Video games set in the Caribbean
Video games set on fictional islands
Video games developed in the United States
Video games with commentaries
Windows games
Xbox 360 games
Xbox 360 Live Arcade games
Video games about zombies
Video games set in the 17th century